Brittany Caroline Haas (born 1987) is an American fiddle player, who also sings and plays the banjo. She is a member of the Boston-based alternative bluegrass band Crooked Still, which is currently on hiatus. She is a regular performer on Live From Here.  She tours with the Haas Marshall Walsh and Haas Kowert Tice trios, and participates in many international fiddlecamps, including the Ossipee Valley Music Festival. As of 2018, she is a member of Hawktail, which includes Kowert and Tice, as well as mandolinist Dominick Leslie.

Early life
Haas grew up in Menlo Park California.  At the age of eight, her violin teacher gave her some bluegrass sheet music to practice sight reading.  For the next five years she took both classical violin and bluegrass fiddle lessons. When she heard Bruce Molsky she recalls “I was like, ‘That’s what I want to do.’ ” .  At 13 years of age, she switched to the fiddle as her primary instrument.

Career timeline
In 2001, when Haas was 14, she toured with Darol Anger's Republic of Strings. 
In 2004, she released her debut, self-titled solo album (produced by Anger on Ook).  It included guest musicians Bruce Molsky, Darol Anger, Todd Sickafoose, Mike Marshall, and her sister, cellist Natalie Haas. 
2005-2009 while at Princeton joined the “chamber grass” band Crooked Still, with whom she has made four recordings and toured the world.
Haas graduated from Princeton University in 2009 with a degree in Evolutionary Biology and a minor in Music Performance. She was a member of the Princeton University Band. 
Haas, Sierra Hull (mandolin), Alison Brown (banjo), Todd Phillips (bass), Andy Hall (Dobro), Matt Wingate (guitar) were members of the Porchlight Band, the house band for the bluegrass documentary Porchlight Sessions (cira 2011). 
In 2015 she and Lauren Rioux recorded a video together on the Roots Channel and often join other groups.
Haas went on tour as part of the band Dave Rawlings Machine, in support of their album Nashville Obsolete.  Haas appeared on multiple tracks as a guest performer. The tour started in November 2015 and continued through April 2016.
From 2003 - current, Haas performs with the Haas Kowert Tice trio, with Paul Kowert on bass and Jordan Tice on guitar. The group was renamed Hawktail with the addition of Dominick Leslie on mandolin.
Haas appeared on the David Rawlings' Band Acony Records release Poor David's Almanack.
 In 2020, she won the Instrumentalist of the Year award at the Americana Music Honors & Awards.
 in 2021, she was selected as Artist in Residence at East Tennessee State University.

Discography

Solo
Brittany Haas (2004)

With Crooked Still
Hop High(2004)
Still Crooked (2008)
 Crooked Still Lives (2009)Some Strange Country (2010)

With The FundiesThe Fundies - EP (2012)

 With Hass Kowert Tice TrioYou Got This (2014)

With Dave Rawlings MachineNashville Obsolete (2015)

With Hawktail
 Unless (2018) 
 Formations'' (2020)
 Place Of Growth (2022)

References

External links
 
 Porchlight Sessions
 Nashvillescene.com
 Mainstreettakoma.org
 Video by Empty Sea Productions 1:31:10

1987 births
Living people
American bluegrass fiddlers
Crooked Still members
The Fundies members